Joseph Peter "Muggsy" Skladany (May 25, 1911 – August 9, 1972) was an American football player and coach. He played college football at the University of Pittsburgh, where he was consensus All-American at end in 1932 and 1933. Skladany played professionally for one season, in 1934, with the Pittsburgh Pirates of the National Football League (NFL). He served as the head football coach at the Carnegie Institute of Technology—now known as Carnegie Mellon University—for one season, in 1943, compiling a record of 0–4–1. Skladany was found dead on August 9, 1972, at the Penn Harris Hotel in Harrisburg, Pennsylvania. He was inducted into the College Football Hall of Fame as a player in 1975.

Head coaching record

References

External links
 
 

1911 births
1972 deaths
American football ends
Carnegie Mellon Tartans football coaches
Pittsburgh Panthers football players
Pittsburgh Pirates (football) players
All-American college football players
College Football Hall of Fame inductees
People from Larksville, Pennsylvania
Players of American football from Pennsylvania
American people of Slovak descent